Plan-d'Orgon is a commune in the Bouches-du-Rhône department in southern France. The commune was created in 1923 from part of Orgon.

Population

See also
 Communes of the Bouches-du-Rhône department

References

Communes of Bouches-du-Rhône
Bouches-du-Rhône communes articles needing translation from French Wikipedia